Lupita Lara (born December 6, 1950) is a Mexican actress.

Early life 
On 6 December 1950, Lara was born as Guadalupe Lara Ochoa in Mexico City, Mexico.

Career 
Lara began her career as a child actress at an early age. At age five, Lara made her debut in the children's play La Jota. At that time she also made her television debut, participating in the programs Bombonsico, Biberolandia and Yo fui testigo. In soap operas she made his debut in 1963 in El secreto, together with Magda Guzmán and José Gálvez. One of his most famous and remembered characters has been Lupita, the sympathetic and dreamy protagonist of Mi secretaria, the successful comedy starring also Pompín Iglesias, César Bono, Zoila Quiñones and Judy Ponte in 1978. The series was so successful that it extended to 1986.

She still working on soap operas, in her career she has outstanding performances in Cruz de amor, Barata de primavera, La fiera, Amor de nadie, De frente al sol, Carita de ángel, El noveno mandamiento, La otra y Amar sin límites, among many others.

Filmography

Telenovelas 

Los Ricos también lloran (2022) Nana Trini 
 Muy padres (2017) .... Miriam Palacios Fernández
 Mujeres de negro (2016) .... Tania Zaldívar
 Mi corazón es tuyo (2015) .... Rubí
 La gata (2014) .... Eugenia Castañeda vda. de Elizalde
 Por siempre mi amor (2013/14) .... Gisela
 Un refugio para el amor (2012) .... Chuy
 Amorcito corazón (2011-2012) 
 Amar sin límites (2006) .... Madre María
 Mundo de fieras (2006) .... Simona
 Alborada (2005) .... Rosario
 Mujer de madera (2004) .... Lucía Ruiz
 Bajo la misma piel (2003) .... Rebeca de Barraza
 ¡Vivan los niños! (2002-2003) .... Cayetana Rubio
 La otra (2002) .... Matilde Portugal
 El noveno mandamiento (2001) .... Elena Villanueva
 Carita de ángel (2000-2001) .... Magdalena
 Soñadoras (1998-1999) .... Viviana
 La paloma (1995) .... Toña Más allá del puente (1993-1994) .... Úrsula De frente al sol (1992) .... Úrsula Amor de nadie (1990) .... Amalia La fiera (1983) .... Elena Martínez Bustamante #1 Al salir el sol (1980) .... Beatriz Donde termina el camino (1978)
 Rina (1977) .... Margarita Los bandidos de Río Frío (1976) .... Amparo Barata de primavera (1975) .... Gabriela Cortés Mi rival (1973)... Elenita
 Los que ayudan a Dios (1973) .... Millie
 Nosotros los pobres (1973)
 Cristo negro (1970) .... Carmen
 El mariachi (1970)
 Cadenas de angustia (1969)
 Rosario (1969)
 Una plegaria en el camino (1969)
 Cruz de amor (1968) .... Marisol Aguirre/Claudia
 Fallaste corazón (1968) .... Leticia
 Juventud divino tesoro (1968)
 Amor sublime (1967)
 Obsesión (1967)
 Rocámbole (1967)
 El cuarto mandamiento (1967)
 No quiero lágrimas (1967)
 Marina Lavalle (1965)
 El secreto (1963)

TV series 
 Hermanos y detectives (2009) .... Esther
 La rosa de Guadalupe (2008) .... Adela (episode "Tacos de canasta")
 Mujer, casos de la vida real (1997 - 2006)
 Tu historia de amor (2003) .... Chole
 ¿Qué nos pasa? (1998)
 Al salir el sol (1980)
 Mi secretaria (1978 - 1986) .... Lupita
 Yo fui testigo
 Biberolandia
 Bombonsico

Movies 
 Infamia (1991)
 Oficio de tinieblas (1981)
 La mafia amarilla (1975)
 Canción de Navidad (1974) .... Estela
 Morirás con el sol (motociclistas suicidas) (1973) .... Mili
 El quelite (1970) .... Hermana de Lucha

References

External links

1950 births
Living people
Mexican telenovela actresses
Mexican television actresses
Mexican film actresses
Actresses from Mexico City